The South/Southwest Hospital Group is one of the hospital groups established by the Health Service Executive in Ireland.

History
The grouping of hospitals was announced by the Irish Minister for Health, Dr. James Reilly TD in May 2013, as part of a restructure of Irish public hospitals and a goal of delivering better patient care. The Group was given responsibility for the following hospitals:

Bantry General Hospital
Cork University Hospital
Kilcreene Orthopaedic Hospital
Mallow General Hospital
Mercy University Hospital
South Infirmary-Victoria University Hospital
Tipperary University Hospital
University Hospital Kerry
University Hospital Waterford

In September 2017 it was reported that the Health Service Executive was considering plans to move South Tipperary General Hospital to another hospital group.

Services
The Group is headed by a Chief Executive, who is accountable to the National Director for Acute Services in the Health Service Executive, and is responsibility for delivering inpatient care, emergency care, maternity services, outpatient care and diagnostic services at its designated hospitals. The Group’s designated cancer centres are Cork University Hospital and University Hospital Waterford. The Group's academic partner is University College Cork.

References

External links
Official site

Hospital networks in Ireland
Health Service Executive
Medical and health organisations based in the Republic of Ireland